Ylivieska railway station is located in the town of Ylivieska in Northern Ostrobothnia, Finland. The station building was completed in 1886.

References

External links 
 

Railway stations in North Ostrobothnia
Railway station
Railway stations opened in 1886